Re:Born is the seventh full-length studio album released by Japanese recording artist Gackt on December 2, 2009 in Japan. It is conceptually linked to its predecessor Rebirth from 2001, and besides the music disc, contains an original audio drama.

Overview

The December 2008, with the release of his first single "Jesus" in over a year, marked Gackt's return to his solo music projects after three years, and the sequel to the concept created and incorporated in the second studio album Rebirth and tour Requiem et Reminiscence I in 2001.

In 2009, on January 28 was released his twenty-ninth single "Ghost", and in commemoration to his 10th anniversary as a solo artist, were released four singles, "Koakuma Heaven", "Faraway", "Lost Angels", and "Flower", a week after one another starting from June 10, and ending on July 1.

The album contains two CDs. The "Music CD" contains songs from six of the eight singles released by Gackt from December 2008 to July 2009, and the "Original Drama CD" contains the original audio story Requiem et Reminiscence II, which is an audio drama featuring Gackt and many well known voice actors such as Hidekatsu Shibata, Unshō Ishizuka, Jun Fukuyama, and Keiji Fujiwara.

Summary
The concept's "Requiem et Reminiscence II" story was first revealed through "Asakura Report" before the tour, and like the "Requiem et Reminiscence I" story, is set during the World War II in Third Reich. It follows two soldiers Rei Hartmann and Ryuichi Asakura who were recruited in the SS German army. Asakura was studying in robotics engineering corporation's laboratory when the eventual friendship triangle between them and Maria was interrupted by Ryuchi's jealousy; the similarity of Rei with disappeared cyborg Proto was enough to unwillingly be transformed into a cyborg. Like Proto, Rei now known as Zero, became Humanoid Assault Weapon Type 2, "Zwei", and the commander of regrouped 4th Independent Tactical Guerrilla Force (part of the 2nd SS Panzer Division Das Reich), shortened name "Ghost". Seemingly with erased memories, Zero began to remember his most precious memories when was human, and when finally recalled and understood his existence, led other awakened cyborgs in a failed revolt against the engineering headquarters.

The theme of the concept, like his other "Moon", is about the existential questions of humanity. Questions who are humans and the existence of a God, and why at the same time destructive and loving, humanity decides to start wars.

Release
A special edition was released exclusively for members of Gackt's fanclub Dears. In addition to the two CDs, this edition includes an extra 10th anniversary disc with two promotional videos for "Flower", extra pictures and documents from the making of Requiem et Reminiscence II, and a special message to his fans.

The album was released on December 2, 2009 in Japan by his own independent label Dears, still owned by Nippon Crown. In the initial daily release it reached number two on the Oricon charts, with sales of 13,371 copies. Although with promising first daily count, in the initial counting week it ended at number nine with sales of 19,655 copies. In the monthly chart were counted sales of 31,403 copies, and charted for 8 weeks. On the Billboard Japan Top Albums chart peaked at number seventeen, and on Top Independent at number three.

The singles "Jesus" and "Ghost" reached number seven and six, and charted for ten and six weeks. The four commemorative singles all managed to enter the top ten on the charts, and all singles sold between 20,000 and 35,000 copies. On the Billboard Japan Hot 100, they mostly reached top forty ("Flower" peaked at number 30), while on Hot Single Sales nearly the same as on Oricon charts ("Lost Angels" peaked at number 5).

The DVD video recording of the final concert, although initially planned for November 18, 2009, because of editing and sound production was released on March 31, 2010. The video film screened in many cinemas across Japan, and attracted an audience of several thousands of spectators.

Promotion
On December 14, Gackt went on his longest nationwide tour , which included over 60 concerts in more than forty-five cities. On May 18, Gackt was scheduled to perform a concert in South Korea at Seoul's Olympic Hall, but due to the effects of the global recession the sponsors of the concert withdrew their support. On June 13, began the arena part of the tour, and on July 4 was held a fanclub concert to celebrate his birthday at the Yoyogi National Stadium. On July 11 and 12 were held the final concerts at the Saitama Super Arena.

Track listing

Notes
"My Father's Day" was written in memory of Fūrin Kazan (Taiga drama) co-actor and close friend, Ken Ogata.
The "Original Drama CD" contains the audio story Requiem et Reminiscence. This story CD contains twenty-five nearly identically titled tracks, starting with "Rebirth to Re:born Zero's Mail - Scene 1" and ending with "Zero's Mail - Scene 25".

Cast
 Rei Hartmann, Zero in RRII, and Proto in RRI: Gackt
 Maria Klose: Nana Mizuki
 Ryuichi Asakura: Jun Fukuyama
 Arkaist: Keiji Fujiwara
 Domino Halemeier: Unshō Ishizuka
 Maria's mother: Kikuko Inoue
 Ghost vice-captain: Tomonori Otsuka
 Professor: Hidekatsu Shibata

Album credits

 Personnel
Vocals, Piano: Gackt 
Guitar, Violin: You
Guitar: Chachamaru
Bass: Ikuo, Masao Akashi
Drums: Jun-Ji, Sakura
Violin: Gen Ittetsu
Programming & Manipulator: You, Tsugumichi “Atw” Takagi, Keiichi “Ishiichan” Sugiyama, Daisuke Kikuchi, Masafumi Okubo (Zack)
Strings Arrangement Coordinate: Mitsunori Ohta (Zack)
Strings Arrangement: Masafumi Okubo (Zack)

 Production
Producer: Gackt
Associate Producer: Chachamaru
Executive Producer: Hiroshi Hasegawa (Gordie Entertainment)
Recording Engineer: Katsuyuki Abe (Mixer’s Lab), Masahiro Shimbo (Mixer’s Lab)
Mixing Engineer/Programming: Masahito Tobisawa
Mastering Engineer: Yoichi Aikawa (Rolling Sound Mastering Stuio)
Recording Studio: Boomerang Studio (Recording), Wonder Station (Final Mixing), Aobadai Studio (Mastering), Pre-Mix and Walla Works Studio (Foley)

 Design
Art direction & Design: Jun Misaki
Photographer: Kenji Tsukagoshi

References

2009 albums
Gackt albums